Effel may refer to:

 Jean Effel (1908–1982), French painter, caricaturist, illustrator and journalist
 Jack Effel, World Series of Poker tournament director; see Tournament director (poker)
 Effel Mohammed, principal of North Eastern College, Sangre Grande, Trinidad, Trinidad and Tobago.
 Effel (1990s), a computer-aided engineering (CAE) package from software developer GRAITEC
 Effel Advance (2000s), former name of the computer-aided engineering (CAE) program Advance Design

See also

 Eiffel (disambiguation)
 Eifel (disambiguation)